Kaash Main Teri Beti Na Hoti (English: I Wish I Was Not Your Daughter) is a Pakistani social serial which premiered on Geo TV in 2011. Written by Kifayat Rodani, the serial was directed by Syed Ali Raza Usama and co-produced by Shahzad Naseeb and Samina Humayun Saeed.

Story 
The story highlights the concept of living conditions of a very poor family in Pakistan and the hardships and difficulties they have to face daily to earn their living. Things are never easy for Khushi commonly known as Pagli and her entire family with their Akbar Ali (Father) selling newspapers but hardly earning anything, Zuleikha (her mother) working as a maid in a rich house but always getting insulted by the owner, while she and Bano (her sister) wash car mirrors on the roads. Ummo (her brother) works in a workshop. They are in such a miserable condition that they have nothing to eat most of the times. The parents are worried about Khushi's marriage but have to hold back because they cannot afford dowry. The story takes an amazing turn and finally a proposal comes for Khushi but it's not just a marriage proposal; it's a one-year contract with selfish intentions behind it. The most shocking thing for Khushi would be when she actually gets to know later about Zuleikha's reality. It will show you how the elite rich class manipulates the poor class for their own motives and then discard them off once they are no longer needed. You will also get to see that money is such a powerful force which can force parents to take certain steps which are unethical. See how things turn out to be as this amazing story develops depicting the reality of our and other third world countries.

Cast 

 Fatima Effendi as Khushi a.k.a. Pagli 
 Danish Taimoor as Junaid Ali Shah – Khushi's husband (Male Protagonist)
 Javeria Abbasi as Shanzay – Junaid's first wife
 Saleem Mairaj as Daud Ali Shah a.k.a. Shahji – Junaid's father
 Taqi Ahmed as Duraid – Junaid's younger brother
 Ismat Zaidi as Shagufta – Junaid's mother
 Salma Zafar as Zulekha – Khushi's mother
 Shakeel Hussain Khan – Asghar
 Shahid Naqvi as Akbar Ali – Khushi's father
 Zuhab Khan as Inu – Khushi's younger brother
 Minal Khan as Bano – Khushi's younger sister
Qaiser Naqvi as Zubaida – Zulekha's friend
 Kanwar Arsalan as Farhan a.k.a. Pappu – Khushi's childhood friend
 Zhalay Sarhadi as Shammo, Khushi's neighbourhood friend

International broadcast

Kassh Main Teri Beti Na Hoti was also broadcast in India on the channel Zindagi. Its first episode was telecasted on 23 June 2014; the day the channel was launched. The show ended its run on 6 December 2014. Zindagi ended the entire show within 159 episodes, while on Geo TV, it took 210 episodes.

References

External links 

Geo TV original programming
Pakistani drama television series
2011 Pakistani television series debuts
Urdu-language telenovelas
Pakistani telenovelas
Zee Zindagi original programming